The European Journal of Pediatrics is a monthly peer-reviewed medical journal covering pediatrics. It was established in 1910 as the Zeitschrift für Kinderheilkunde, obtaining its current name in 1975. It is published by Springer Science+Business Media and is the official journal of both the Belgian Pediatric Society and the Swiss Pediatric Society. The editor-in-chief is Peter de Winter (Spaarne Gasthuis). According to the Journal Citation Reports, the journal has a 2021 impact factor of 3.860.

References

External links

Pediatrics journals
Monthly journals
Publications established in 1910
Springer Science+Business Media academic journals
English-language journals
Academic journals associated with international learned and professional societies of Europe